Brzezie may refer to the following places in Poland:
Brzezie, Gostyń County in Greater Poland Voivodeship (west-central Poland)
Brzezie, Kępno County in Greater Poland Voivodeship (west-central Poland)
Brzezie, Koło County in Greater Poland Voivodeship (west-central Poland)
Brzezie, Pleszew County in Greater Poland Voivodeship (west-central Poland)
Brzezie, Środa Wielkopolska County in Greater Poland Voivodeship (west-central Poland)
Brzezie, Kuyavian-Pomeranian Voivodeship (north-central Poland)
Brzezie, Kraków County in Lesser Poland Voivodeship (south Poland)
Brzezie, Wieliczka County in Lesser Poland Voivodeship (south Poland)
Brzezie, Gmina Drużbice in Łódź Voivodeship (central Poland)
Brzezie, Gmina Szczerców in Łódź Voivodeship (central Poland)
Brzezie, Piotrków County in Łódź Voivodeship (central Poland)
Brzezie, Lower Silesian Voivodeship (south-west Poland)
Brzezie (Pomorsko) in Lubusz Voivodeship (west Poland)
Brzezie (Sulechów) in Lubusz Voivodeship (west Poland)
Brzezie, Busko County in Świętokrzyskie Voivodeship (south-central Poland)
Brzezie, Opatów County in Świętokrzyskie Voivodeship (south-central Poland)
Brzezie, Starachowice County in Świętokrzyskie Voivodeship (south-central Poland)
Brzezie, Opole Voivodeship (south-west Poland)
Brzezie, Pomeranian Voivodeship (north Poland)
Brzezie, Racibórz in Silesian Voivodeship (south Poland)